The Kusong class torpedo boats are a North Korean class of torpedo boat. The Korean People's Navy is estimated to operate 60 of them.

Specifications
The Kusong-class is armed with two  torpedoes. They displace  at full load.

Service history
During a Naval drill off Nampo, by the Korean People's Navy, on October 5, 2016, four Kusong-class torpedo boats were part of the 80 some training fleet.

References

Torpedo boats of North Korea